Clorène Rateau (born 18 January 1993) is a Haitian footballer who plays as a defender. She has been a member of the Haiti women's national team.

References 

1993 births
Living people
Women's association football defenders
Haitian women's footballers
Haiti women's international footballers
Competitors at the 2014 Central American and Caribbean Games